Mickey's Tent Show is a 1933 short film in Larry Darmour's Mickey McGuire series starring a young Mickey Rooney. Directed by Jesse Duffy, the two-reel short was released to theaters on October 27, 1933 by Post Pictures Corp.

Synopsis
Mickey and the Gang decide to put on a circus show for the neighborhood kids. As usual, Stinkie Davis and his pals try whatever they can to make their rivals miserable. Throughout the show, whenever Mickey and his friends try to perform an act, Stinkie interrupts them by playing his father's new radio.

Cast
In order by credits:
Mickey Rooney - "Mickey McGuire"
Douglas Scott - "Stinkey" Davis
Marvin Stephens - "Katrink"
Jimmie Robinson - "Hambone" Johnson
Billy Barty - Billy McGuire ("Mickey's Little Brother")
Shirley Jeane Rickert - "Tomboy Taylor"

External links 
 

1933 films
1933 comedy films
American black-and-white films
Mickey McGuire short film series
1933 short films
American comedy short films
1930s English-language films
1930s American films